"Love Sensation" is a 1980 song performed by American R&B singer Loleatta Holloway, taken from her album of the same name. The song was produced and written by Dan Hartman, arranged by Norman Harris, and mixed by Tom Moulton. It was a hit on the U.S. Hot Dance Club Play chart, where the song spent a week at No. 1 in September 1980. It was widely sampled, particularly in house music, such as in the 1989 Black Box song "Ride on Time".

Development 
Originally, Hartman envisioned either Bette Midler or Patti LaBelle as singing "Love Sensation". However, after seeing Holloway perform at a nightclub, he approached her instead to sing the vocals. In various interviews, Holloway recalled that Hartman had her perform the song 29 times over a two-day recording session. She lost her voice as a result, and only recovered by putting Vicks VapoRub in her coffee.

Samples 
Since the rise of the remix culture during the 1980s, "Love Sensation" has been heavily sampled with large portions of the song incorporated into other works. The original 1989 release of "Ride on Time" by Black Box sampled Holloway's "Thank you baby, 'cause you're right (sic) on time" lyric before a rerecording as well as instrumental portions by the Salsoul Orchestra, and Hartman received writing credit.

In 1991, "Good Vibrations" by Marky Mark and the Funky Bunch lifted a sample of Holloway's singing.  She received singing credit on the No. 1 song, giving Holloway her highest U.S. pop chart hit. Holloway even made an appearance performing the chorus in the music video.  "Good Vibrations" itself has been frequently sampled with the inclusion of Holloway's contribution.

Parts of the song have been sampled and re-used in songs such as:
"I Wanna Have Some Fun" (1988) by Samantha Fox
"Ride on Time" (1989) by Black Box
 "I Don't Know Anybody Else" (1989) by Black Box/Martha Wash.
"Grand Piano" (1989) by Mixmaster
"Just Like A Queen" (1989) by Ellis-D
"Dance 2 Trance" (1990) by Dance 2 Trance
"We All Feel Better in the Dark" (1990) by the Pet Shop Boys
"Take Me Away" (1990) by 2 in a Room (using the same sample as Cappella)
"Take Me Away" (1991) by Cappella
"Good Vibrations" (1991) by Marky Mark and the Funky Bunch
"Move" (1993) by Moby
"(You Got Me) Burnin' Up" (1998) Cevin Fisher feat. Loleatta Holloway
"Semisation" (2004) by Technical Itch
"Love Sensation" (2006) by Eddie Thoneick & Kurd Maverick
"Take Me Away" (2008) by Chase & Status
"Burning Up" (2009) by Skream
"Still Speedin'" (2011) by Sway
"Blind Faith" (2011) by Chase & Status
"Bootleg Fireworks (Burning Up)" (2012) by Dillon Francis
"Soul Train" (2012) by Geck-e
"Devil In Me" (2012) by Alexandra Burke
"Semisation 2013" (2013) by Technical Itch vs. The Panacea
"Overtime" (2013) by Cash Cash
"Day and Night" feat. Will Miller & Carter Lang (2014) by A Billion Young
"Good Vibration" (2015) by Majk Spirit & DJ Mad Skill
"Good Vibes" (2015) by Kryder & The Wulf
"Temptation" (2015) by Still Young, Simon de Jano & Madwill
"Gud Vibrations" (2015) by Nghtmre & SLANDER
"Natural Power" (2015) by Ruiz Cunha
"So Nice!" (2016) by Diserpier
"World of Our Love" (2016) by Client Liaison
"Disco Sensation" (2016) by Funkatron
"Let Me Tell You" (2017) by ANOTR
"Ketamine Dreams" (2017) by Partiboi69
"Sensational" (2017) by Sam Feldt
"Sweet Sensation" (2018) by Flo-Rida
"Summer Love" (2018) by Liam Berkeley
"You Get Down" (2019) by Todd Terry
"Seat Belt" (2019) by ROBPM
"You Little Beauty" (2019) by Fisher
"This Is Oh!" (2019) by Elio Riso and Muter & Muter
"Camba" (2019) by Fer BR
"Feeling Good" (2019) by Brokenears

Remixes 
In addition to Tom Moulton's 1980 remix for the original 12" single release, the song has been subject to a number of other remixes.  These include:

"Love Sensation (Freemasons Remix)" by Freemasons
"Love Sensation 2006" by Eddie Thoneick & Kurd Maverick (UK: No. 37)
"Love Sensation 2008 (Ride On Time)" by ON-X
"Love Sensation 2010" by Alexander Cruz
"Love Sensation (Scorccio Hot Mix)" from Dancemania Presents: Scorccio Super Hit Mix
"Sensational" by Sam Feldt

See also
List of number-one dance hits (United States)

References

External links
"Love Sensation" full audio via Salsoul Music
"Love Sensation" single release at Discogs

1980 singles
1980 songs
Loleatta Holloway songs
Song recordings produced by Dan Hartman
Songs written by Dan Hartman